Cosmic Coaster may refer to one of two junior roller coasters:
 Cosmic Coaster (Valleyfair), at Valleyfair in Shakopee, Minnesota
 Cosmic Coaster (Worlds of Fun), at Worlds of Fun in Kansas City, Missouri